The following lists events that happened during 1845 in New Zealand.

Population
The estimated population of New Zealand at the end of 1845 is 72,500 Māori and 12,774 non-Māori.

Incumbents

Regal and viceregal
Head of State – Queen Victoria
Governor – Captain Robert Fitzroy is dismissed on 18 November and replaced by Sir George Grey.

Government and law
Chief Justice — William Martin

Events 
 19 January: Hone Heke cuts down the British flagstaff at Kororareka for the third time in the lead-up to the Flagstaff War.
 2 April: The Wellington Independent publishes its first issue. The newspaper continues to publish bi-weekly or tri-weekly until 1874.
 7 June: The New Zealander begins publishing. The Auckland-based newspaper publishes weekly, then bi-weekly and from 1859 daily. It will cease publishing in 1866.

Births

 11 October: Charles Johnston, Mayor of Wellington and politician.

Unknown date
 Samuel Brown, mayor of Wellington (in Ireland).
 John Roberts, mayor of Lower Hutt (in Scotland; October).

Deaths

 1 July:  George Phillpotts, naval officer
 8 September: Te Peehi Turoa, tribal leader

See also
History of New Zealand
List of years in New Zealand
Military history of New Zealand
Timeline of New Zealand history
Timeline of New Zealand's links with Antarctica
Timeline of the New Zealand environment

References

External links